Stolen Heaven is a 1931 American Pre-Code drama film directed by George Abbott and starring Nancy Carroll, Phillips Holmes, and Louis Calhern. It was released on February 21, 1931, by Paramount Pictures.

Plot
Mary, a girl of the streets, and Joe, a young thief, rob twenty thousand dollars and decide to spend all the money and then commit suicide. But Joe's conscience speaks louder and he confesses the crime. He goes to prison knowing that Mary will wait for him.

Cast
Nancy Carroll as Mary
Phillips Holmes as Joe
Louis Calhern as Steve Perry
Edward Keane as Detective Morgan
Guy Kibbee as Police Commissioner

See also
 1931 in film
 List of American films of 1931
 List of drama films
 List of Paramount Pictures films

External links

1931 films
1931 drama films
American drama films
American black-and-white films
Films directed by George Abbott
Paramount Pictures films
1930s English-language films
1930s American films